Powertrip is the fourth studio album by American rock band Monster Magnet, released on June 16, 1998. The album was the band's commercial breakthrough, achieving mainstream success due largely to the hit single, "Space Lord". Other hit songs on the album include "Powertrip", "Temple of Your Dreams", and "See You in Hell". The album itself, reached #1 on the Heatseekers Charts, #21 in the German Charts, #65 in the UK Charts, and #97 on the Billboard 200. The album was certified gold by the RIAA on January 25, 1999.

Music videos were made for the songs "Space Lord", "Powertrip", and "See You in Hell".

Recording
After the Dopes to Infinity tour, Dave Wyndorf flew to Las Vegas to work on the group's next album. He got a hotel room  outside the city, where he would write one song a day for twenty-one days. Most of the songs were based on the themes of Las Vegas, such as naked women and people losing their money. The song "Tractor" is a re-recorded version of the song originally released on the band's 1990 EP Monster Magnet.

Tracks used in popular culture
 "Powertrip" was one of the songs in the film Soldier, starring Kurt Russell.
 "Powertrip" was the official theme song for the WWE pay-per-view event No Way Out 2007.
 "Space Lord" was one of the songs in the film Talladega Nights: The Ballad of Ricky Bobby, starring Will Ferrell and John C. Reilly.
 "Crop Circle" was one of the songs in the film Urban Legend.
 "See you in Hell" was one of the songs in the film Bride of Chucky.
 "Powertrip" was featured in the 2006 video game MotorStorm.
 "Powertrip" is part of the soundtrack video game Far Cry 5.

Track listing

Original CD

All songs written by Dave Wyndorf unless noted otherwise.

Japanese bonus tracks
"Big God" – 5:58
 "Kick Out the Jams" (MC5 cover) – 2:35
 "The Game" – 4:54

A Limited Tour Edition was also released with a bonus CD entitled Viva Las Vegas (Live in Las Vegas). The Japanese version contains this bonus CD and three bonus tracks on the original.

Viva Las Vegas (Live in Las Vegas)
 "Temple of Your Dreams" – 5:34
 "Dinosaur Vacuum" – 5:19
 "Baby Götterdämmerung" – 4:00
 "Cage Around the Sun" – 8:18
 "Bummer" – 7:35
 "Space Lord" – 9:32

Personnel
 Dave Wyndorf – vocals, guitar
 Ed Mundell – guitar
 Philip Caivano – guitar
 Joe Calandra – bass 
 Jon Kleiman – drums

Additional personnel
 Matt Hyde – guitar, engineer, mixing
 John Flannery –  guitar
 Scott Garrett – drums
 Tim Cronin – autovisuals, misinformation, herald of galactus

Production
 Steve Mixdorf – assistant engineer
 Jesse Fishman –  assistant engineer
 Cameron Webb – assistant engineer
 Paul Silveira – assistant engineer
 Randy Staub –  mixing
 John Travis – mixing
 Ron Boustead – digital editing
 Don C. Tyler – digital editing
 Stephen Marcussen –  mastering

Chart positions

Album

Singles

Certifications

References

1998 albums
Monster Magnet albums
A&M Records albums
Albums produced by Matt Hyde